The Iglésia Católica Sagrado Corazón de Jesus is a church in Guatemala City, Guatemala.

See also
Roman Catholic Archdiocese of Santiago de Guatemala

References

External links
Google map

Roman Catholic churches in Guatemala
Guatemala City